Rui Pedro da Silva e Sousa (born 20 March 1998), known as Rui Pedro, is a Portuguese professional footballer who plays for Slovenian club Olimpija Ljubljana as a striker.

Club career
Born in Castelo de Paiva, Aveiro District, Rui Pedro joined FC Porto's youth system in 2012, aged 14. On 24 January 2015, two months shy of his 17th birthday, he made his professional debut with their B team, coming on as a late substitute in a 1–0 away loss against U.D. Oliveirense in the Segunda Liga.

On 3 December 2016, whilst still a junior, Rui Pedro first appeared in the Primeira Liga with the main squad; after replacing Óliver Torres 15 minutes from the end of the home fixture against S.C. Braga, he scored the only goal in injury time, ending the club's negative run of 520 minutes without finding the net. Four days later, also from the bench, he played his first match in the UEFA Champions League, as the hosts defeated already qualified Leicester City 5–0 to also reach the knockout stage; late in the year, UEFA.com selected him as their "weekly wonderkid".

Rui Pedro went on to serve four loans during his spell at the Estádio do Dragão, starting out at Boavista FC (top division), then moving to Varzim SC (second tier), Club Recreativo Granada (Spanish Segunda División B) and Leixões SC (division two). In September 2020, he signed a permanent two-year contract with the latter.

From January 2021 to June 2022, Rui Pedro continued competing in his country's second division with F.C. Penafiel, but he only managed to score five times in all competitions during his tenure. In August 2022, he agreed to a deal at NK Olimpija Ljubljana of the Slovenian PrvaLiga.

Career statistics

Club

Honours
Porto B
LigaPro: 2015–16

Individual
UEFA European Under-19 Championship Team of the Tournament: 2017

References

External links

Portuguese League profile 

1998 births
Living people
People from Castelo de Paiva
Sportspeople from Aveiro District
Portuguese footballers
Association football forwards
Primeira Liga players
Liga Portugal 2 players
FC Porto players
Padroense F.C. players
FC Porto B players
Boavista F.C. players
Varzim S.C. players
Leixões S.C. players
F.C. Penafiel players
Segunda División B players
Club Recreativo Granada players
Slovenian PrvaLiga players
NK Olimpija Ljubljana (2005) players
Portugal youth international footballers
Portuguese expatriate footballers
Expatriate footballers in Spain
Expatriate footballers in Slovenia
Portuguese expatriate sportspeople in Spain
Portuguese expatriate sportspeople in Slovenia